Wikus Botha (born 11 April 1968) is a South African cricketer. He played in 36 first-class and 60 List A matches from 1991/92 to 1998/99.

References

External links
 

1968 births
Living people
South African cricketers
Eastern Province cricketers
Easterns cricketers
People from Germiston